Saint-Clet is a municipality located in the Vaudreuil-Soulanges Regional County Municipality within the Montérégie region of Quebec, Canada. Completely surrounded by agricultural land (mostly corn fields), the town is centred on the intersection of two main provincial highways. The north–south Route 201 is known as rue Principale within the town limits, and the east–west Route 340 is known as Boulevard de la Cité des Jeunes.

History
The parish of Saint-Clet was established in 1849 by its detachment from the parish of Saint-Ignace-du-Coteau-du-Lac at the request of residents who had to go all the way to Coteau-du-Lac to attend mass. The first resident pastor of Saint-Clet was appointed in 1851 and four years later in 1855, the Parish Municipality of Saint-Clet was created.

There were some mergers and demergers of territory over the ensuing years until August 31, 1974, when the current municipality of Saint-Clet was created through the merger of the Parish and Village Municipalities of Saint-Clet.

The Canadian composer and music educator, Achille Fortier, was born in Saint-Clet in 1864.

Events in the news
On 17 February 1954, a collision of two Canadian Pacific trains took place in Saint-Clet. It was a time when train travel was quite popular, and it was common for a train to travel in two separate sections. The impact occurred when the second section of the Toronto-Montreal train rear-ended the first section at the village station, where it had stopped because of a snowstorm. The accident caused one death and 73 injuries.

Another event occurred on 14 March 1985, when heavy rains caused flooding, resulting in the evacuation of many homes.
Heavy flooding again affected the town on 8 April 2014, when light rains and abruptly mild temperatures resulted in the rapid melting of a large volume of snow in a short period of time. The elevated railbed passing east–west through the town forms an artificial berm, impeding the flow of meltwater runoff from north to south. With only a couple of culverts to let the runoff go under the railbed, they were quickly overwhelmed and many basements north of the tracks were flooded.

Demographics

Language

Local government
List of former mayors (since formation of current municipality):
 Joseph Ferdinand Charles Edouard Leduc (1974–1977)
 Joseph Paul Arthur André Leroux (1977–1994)
 Joseph Théophile Gaétan Pilon (1994–1995)
 Joseph-Aldema-Guy-Gilles Farand (1995–2013)
 Nicole Loiselle (2013)
 Daniel Beaupré (2013–2021)
 Mylène Labre (2021–present)

Education
Commission Scolaire des Trois-Lacs operates Francophone schools.
 École Cuillierrier

Lester B. Pearson School Board operates Anglophone schools.
 Evergreen Elementary and Forest Hill Elementary (Junior Campus and Senior campus) in Saint-Lazare or Soulanges Elementary School in Saint-Télesphore

See also
 List of municipalities in Quebec

References

External links

Municipalities in Quebec
Incorporated places in Vaudreuil-Soulanges Regional County Municipality